Sumpter v Hedges [1898] 1 QB 673 is an English contract law case, concerning substantial performance of a contract and restitution for unjust enrichment.

Facts
Mr Sumpter was a builder. He had a contract to build two houses and stables for Mr Hedges for £560. He did work valued at £333 and said he had to stop because he had no more money. Substantial payments on account have in fact been made to the builder. Hedges finished the building, using materials which Sumpter had left behind. Sumpter sued for the outstanding money.

Bruce J found that Mr Sumpter had abandoned the contract, and said he could obtain money for the value of the materials but nothing for the work.

Judgment
The Court of Appeal found that Mr Sumpter had abandoned the building work and emphasised that it left Mr Hedges without any choice of whether to adopt the work. It held that Mr Hedges had to pay for the building materials that he used, but did not need to reimburse Mr Sumpter for the half-built structures. AL Smith LJ gave the leading judgment:

Chitty LJ concurred.

Collins LJ concurred.

See also
Cutter v Powell (1795) 6 TR 320; 101 ER 573 
Hoenig v Isaacs [1952] 2 All ER 176 
Bolton v Mahadeva [1972] 2 All ER 1322

References

English contract case law
English unjust enrichment case law
Court of Appeal (England and Wales) cases
1898 in case law
1898 in British law